Gun Belt is a 1953 American Western film directed by Ray Nazarro and starring George Montgomery and Tab Hunter.

Plot
A former outlaw, Billy Ringo, clashes with his old gang. He had hung up his guns, bought a ranch and fallen in love with Arlene Reach (Helen Westcott), whom he plans to marry as soon as possible. Billy has let his nephew, Chip, live and work the ranch with him while Chip's father, Matt Ringo (John Dehner) is serving a prison sentence. Billy is determined that Chip keep on the straight and narrow.

Matt breaks out of prison and joins his three outlaw buddies - Dixon, Holloway, and Hoke - in a plan to pull a bank robbery. The plan, however, needs Billy Ringo's participation.

Billy refuses to join the robbery plot or to help his brother escape recapture. This angers Chip, who decides to join his father. An altercation occurs during which Billy accidentally kills Matt; Chip then becomes more determined to follow in his father's footsteps, as well as exact revenge upon his uncle.

Billy devises a plan to dissuade Chip and stop the gang and its devious ringleader, Ike Clinton. He arranges details with Marshal Wyatt Earp, telling him about the gang's plan to rob a Wells Fargo express wagon. A gunfight ensues at the robbery site. Chip realizes his mistake as Clinton murders his own men before he is subdued by Billy and handed over to Earp.

Cast
George Montgomery as Billy Ringo
Tab Hunter as Chip Ringo
Helen Westcott as Arlene Reach
John Dehner as Matt Ringo
William Bishop as Ike Clinton
Jack Elam as Kolloway
Douglas Kennedy as Dixon
James Millican as Wyatt Earp
Hugh Sanders as Douglas Frazer
Bruce Cowling as Virgil Earp
William 'Bill' Phillips  as Curley
Willis Bouchey as Endicott

Production
The film was originally known as Johnny Ringo, Tombstone Trail and Screaming Eagles. Its plotline and lines are duplicated in another Edward Small production, Five Guns to Tombstone (1960).

Hunter signed in October 1952.

Filming started 13 November 1952 at the Goldwyn studios.

References

External links

Gun Belt at TCMDB

1953 films
American Western (genre) films
1953 Western (genre) films
Cultural depictions of Wyatt Earp
Films produced by Edward Small
1950s English-language films
Films directed by Ray Nazarro
1950s American films
Films with screenplays by Richard Schayer
Films about outlaws